People on Wheels, also translated as Trailer People, is a 1966 Czech drama film directed by Martin Frič.

Cast
 Vlastimil Brodský as Beznohý
 Slávka Budínová as Marie
 Josef Hlinomaz as Congr
 Jozef Króner as Clown
 Dana Medřická as Gruzínka
 Ilja Prachar as Reimann
 Čestmír Řanda as Director
 Jaroslav Rozsíval as Ferdinand
 Martin Růžek as Lotys
 Jiřina Štěpničková as Zanda
 Jan Tříska as Acrobat Vincek
 Emília Vášáryová as Nina
 Josef Vetrovec as Vencl

References

External links
 

1966 films
1966 drama films
Czechoslovak drama films
1960s Czech-language films
Films directed by Martin Frič
Czech drama films
1960s Czech films